{{Infobox comic book title

| image               = 'Buffy the Vampire Slayer' Season 11.png
| imagesize           = 
| caption             = Promotional art of the Buffy the Vampire Slayer Season Eleven comic book series. art by Steve Morris.
| title = Buffy the Vampire Slayer Season Eleven
| schedule            = Monthly
| format              = 
| limited             = Y
| genre               = Horror
| publisher           =  Dark Horse Comics
| date                =
| startmo             = November
| startyr             = 2016
| endmo               = May
| endyr               = 2018
| issues              = 12 (each core series) 4 (Giles)
| main_char_team      = Scooby Gang
| issn                =
| writers             = Buffy:Christos Gage  Angel:Corinna Becko  Giles: Joss Whedon & Erika Alexander 
| artists             = 
| pencillers          = Buffy:Rebekah Isaacs Megan Levens Georges Jeanty Angel:Geraldo Borges Ze Carlos   Giles: Jon Lam
| inkers              = 
| letterers           = 
| colorists           = 
| editors             = 
| creative_team_month = 
| creative_team_year  = 
| creators            = Joss Whedon
| TPB                 = 
| ISBN                = 
| subcat              = 
| altcat              = 
| sort                = Buffy the Vampire Slayer Season Eleven
| nonUS               = 
}}Buffy the Vampire Slayer Season Eleven is the sequel to the Season Ten comic book series, a canonical continuation of the television series Buffy the Vampire Slayer. Buffy & Angel consist of only 12 issues per series, a much shorter run than the previous seasons, while the miniseries, Giles, runs for 4 issues. The series was published by Dark Horse Comics and began on November 23, 2016.

The series was concluded with Season Twelve which began on June 20, 2018 and concluded on September 19, 2018.

Publication

Buffy the Vampire Slayer Season Eleven

Single issues

Trade Paperbacks

Angel Season Eleven

Single issues

Trade Paperbacks

Giles Season Eleven

Single issues

Trade Paperbacks

References

External links
 Buffy the Vampire Slayer at Dark Horse Comics

Season 11
Season 11
Sequel comics
LGBT-related comics
2016 in comics